Upper Strasburg is an unincorporated community in Letterkenny Township in Franklin County, Pennsylvania, United States.

Upper Strasburg is located at the intersection of Pennsylvania Route 533, State Route 4004 (Mountain Road/Valley Road), and Community Road, northwest of Chambersburg and north of the Letterkenny Army Depot.

The road from Upper Strasburg to Fannettsburg and on to Burnt Cabins was built circa 1790 and for many years formed part of the main road from Philadelphia to Pittsburgh. The road is now part of SR 4004 and was known as Three Mountain Road or Horse Valley Road but is generally known as Upper Strasburg Road now.

The town was laid out in 1789 by Dewalt Keefer and serviced Conestoga wagons and travelers crossing the mountains.  The early post office, established by 1797, was originally known simply as Strasburg, but the name was changed to  Upper Strasburg by 1830 to distinguish it from towns in eastern Pennsylvania. In 1873 the town had three churches, "one hotel, one steam tannery, one sawmill, two stores, two blacksmith, two shoe-maker, two cabinet-maker, one tailor and one saddler shops, and two hundred ninety-three inhabitants."

ZIP code information

References

Unincorporated communities in Franklin County, Pennsylvania
Unincorporated communities in Pennsylvania